The Thousand Guineas Prelude, registered as the Tranquil Star Stakes, is a Melbourne Racing Club Group 2 Thoroughbred horse race, for three year old fillies, at set weights with penalties, over a distance of 1400 metres, held annually at Caulfield Racecourse, Melbourne, Australia in late September. Total prize money for the race is A$300,000. This event is a preparation race for the prestigious Group 1 The Thousand Guineas later in October at Caulfield.

History

The registered name of the race is named after Australian Hall of Fame champion mare from the 1940s Tranquil Star.

Name
 1983–1989 - Health Stakes
 1990–2001 - Tranquil Star Stakes
 2002–2005 - Jumeirah International Stakes  
 2006 - Tranquil Star Stakes
 2007–2020 - Thousand Guineas Prelude
 2021 - TG Prelude

Grade
1983–1999 - Listed race
2000–2012 - Group 3
2013 onwards - Group 2

Distance
 1983–1989 - 1600 metres
 1990 onwards - 1400 metres

Winners

 2022 - Boogie Dancer
 2021 - Bon's A Pearla
 2020 - Instant Celebrity
 2019 - Acting
 2018 - Smart Melody
 2017 - Booker
 2016 - Legless Veuve
 2015 - Miss Gunpowder
 2014 - Afleet Espirit
 2013 - Gregers
 2012 - Lady Of Harrods
 2011 - Bliss Street
 2010 - Divorces
 2009 - Irish Lights
 2008 - Ortensia
 2007 - Gabbidon
 2006 - Miss Finland
 2005 - Doubting
 2004 - Hollow Bullet
 2003 - Hinting
 2002 - La Bella Dame
 2001 - Haste Ye Back
 2000 - So Gorgeous
 1999 - Miss Pennymoney 
 1998 - Danelagh 
 1997 - Cornwall Queen 
 1996 - Derobe 
 1995 - Rubidium 
 1994 - Majestic Dawn 
 1993 - Brompton Cross 
 1992 - Azzurro
 1991 - Chador
 1990 - Century Pike
 1989 - Pleasure Bandit
 1988 - Imposing Bloom
 1987 - Bianco Flyer
 1986 - Shackle
 1985 - Jewel In The Crown
 1984 - Christmas Hamper
 1983 - My Marseillaise

See also
 List of Australian Group races
 Group races

References

Horse races in Australia